The South Wales Joint Scientific Investigation Unit is a specialist forensic police unit established in April 2012. It specialises in analysis of drugs, glass, fingerprints, digital crime scenes, ballistics, trace evidence, and forensic samples.

The SWJSIU is based in Bridgend. It is funded by and serves South Wales Police and Gwent Police, independent from the Forensic Science Service of England and Wales.

The unit is the only one of its kind in the UK able to undertake glass investigation, which will involve examining fragments of smashed glass for forensic evidence, and exports copies to the UK National DNA Database. It is also one of only three to have a "metal vacuum deposition room", to obtain fingerprints from smooth surfaces such as carrier bags and glass.

The SWJSIU was launched after the closure of the nearby government-owned Forensic Science Service (FSS) regional laboratory in Chepstow.

The department is a Centre of Excellence and is obtaining ISO accreditation.

See also 

 South Wales Police
 DNA
 Forensic science
 Law enforcement in Wales

References

External links 

 Official website

2012 establishments in Wales
Law enforcement agencies of Wales
Bridgend
Science and technology in Wales
Databases in Wales
Forensic government agencies
Government databases in the United Kingdom
Government agencies established in 2012